AkroTech Aviation, Inc. was an American aircraft manufacturer based in Scappoose, Oregon. The company specialized in the design and manufacture of kits for aerobatic aircraft. The company went out of business after 1998.

The company's two designs, the single-seat Giles G-200 and the two-seat G-202 were built from composites. The company could also supply completed ready-to-fly aircraft for the Experimental - exhibition category.

Aircraft

References

Defunct aircraft manufacturers of the United States
Aerobatic aircraft
Homebuilt aircraft